Poecilotheria striata, or the Mysore ornamental tarantula, is a large arboreal tarantula of the family Theraphosidae. It is endemic to India.

Ecology
The species is found in dry and moist deciduous forests, at altitudes between 500 and 1000 m. It appears to be present in fewer than 10 severely fragmented locations.

Conservation status
P. striata is classified as vulnerable due to its restricted and declining range and occupancy, and the ongoing fragmentation of its habitat. The species is commonly traded in the pet trade.
A distribution survey published in 2015 found further population losses and suggested that the species be reclassified as Near Threatened.

References

External links
P. striata at ITIS
Genus Poecilotheria at CITES.org
Care of the related species P. pederseni

striata
Spiders of Asia
Spiders described in 1895
Endemic fauna of Sri Lanka